MS Seatruck Performance is a ro-ro freight ferry that entered service with Seatruck Ferries April in 2012.

The vessel was on charter to Stena Line for 6 years from Seatruck Ferries, during which she was named Stena Performer.

History
She is one of four ships built by Flensburger Schiffbau-Gesellschaft, Germany. The vessel is the third newbuild to be completed.

The vessel was launched in January 2012. The vessel was christened by Virginia O'Reilly, the wife of O'Reilly Transport Ltd (Ireland)'s managing director Eugene O'Reilly. The ship was completed and handed over on 16 April 2012. Seatruck Performance entered service on the Heysham to Dublin route on 23 April 2012.

In September 2012 Seatruck Performance along with sister ship Seatruck Precision went on charter to Stena Line and was renamed Stena Performer.

On Monday 7 September 2015, the vessel will transfer to the Liverpool to Belfast service, in order to increase freight on the popular route. Stena Hibernia (currently operating the Liverpool service), will take over Performer's route.

Description
Stena Performer is one of four RoRo 2200 freight ferries, which are the largest ships in the Seatruck fleet. They are the largest ships to operate out of the port of Heysham.

The RoRo 2200 vessels have a freight capacity of 2,166 lane metres over four decks, carrying 151 trailers. Propulsion is provided by two MAN engines and twin screws.

Sister Vessels
 Seatruck Power
 Seatruck Precision
 Seatruck Progress

References

2012 ships
Ships of Seatruck Ferries
Ferries of the United Kingdom
Ships built in Flensburg
Merchant ships of the Isle of Man